Kansas Bankers Surety Company (KBS) is an insurance company based in the United States. It is a subsidiary of Berkshire Hathaway, the investment vehicle of Warren Buffett. It specializes in the writing of surety bonds for the officers of small, state chartered banks in the Midwestern United States.  It formerly  also wrote deposit insurance at such banks for coverage in excess of the per-depositor limits of the Federal Deposit Insurance Corporation, but this line of business was discontinued in 2008.

Kansas Bankers Surety was acquired by Wesco Financial Corporation in 1996. Berkshire Hathaway had owned 80% of Wesco since the 1970s, and in 2010 it announced its intention to acquire the remainder and become 100% owner of Wesco. Kansas Bankers Surety became part of the Berkshire Hathaway  Companies on December 31, 2013.  As part of a 2015 rebranding, the company began referring to itself as simply KBS.

In 2016, KBS announced that it would be exiting the bank insurance market and discontinuing all insurance products.

References

External links

Berkshire Hathaway
Insurance companies of the United States
American companies established in 1909
Financial services companies established in 1909
Financial services companies of the United States
1909 establishments in Kansas
1996 mergers and acquisitions